The 2018 Women's State of Origin was the first State of Origin rugby league match between the New South Wales and Queensland women's teams played at North Sydney Oval on 22 June 2018. 

The game was the first played under the State of Origin banner. Prior to 2018, the teams played each other annually in the Women's Interstate Challenge before being rebranded as State of Origin. New South Wales defeated Queensland 16–10 to record their third straight win over the Maroons. New South Wales  Isabelle Kelly was awarded the Nellie Doherty Medal for Player of the Match.

Background
On 6 December 2017, the National Rugby League announced that the Women's Interstate Challenge, which ran from 1999 to 2017, would be rebranded as the Women's State of Origin. The game which, was previously played as a curtain-raiser, would now be a standalone fixture broadcast on the Nine Network and Fox Sports.

Teams

Match summary

References

2018 in Australian rugby league
State of Origin
State of Origin
2018
State of Origin
Rugby league in Sydney
Rugby league competitions in New South Wales
North Sydney, New South Wales